Magas is the capital of the Republic of Ingushetia, Russia.

Magas may also refer to:

Other places
Magas Urban Okrug, a municipal formation into which the town of republic significance of Magas in the Republic of Ingushetia, Russia is incorporated
Magas Airport, an airport in the Republic of Ingushetia, Russia
Magas, former name of Zaboli, a city in Iran
Magās (AKA Mazaj), village in Semnan Province, Iran
Magaš, a village in Bojnik Municipality, Serbia
Magas, Guayanilla, Puerto Rico, a barrio

People
Ancient eastern-Mediterranean nobility:
Magas of Macedon, a Greek Macedonian nobleman and the father of Berenice I of Egypt
Magas of Cyrene, grandson of Magas of Macedon, Greek Macedonian governor, and King of Cyrene
Magas of Egypt, grandson of Magas of Cyrene
Ljubomir Magaš (1948–1986), Yugoslav amateur boxer, streetfighter, and gangster
István Magas (born 1952), Hungarian
 Magas, nom de guerre of Ali Taziev (born 1974), former Ingush commander of Caucasian Front & life-sentenced prisoner in Russia

Other
Magas (brachiopod), a brachiopod genus

See also
Maghas, the medieval capital of the Alans
Maga (disambiguation)